Traditional western medicine may refer to:
 Evidence-based medicine
 Pre-scientific medicine of Europe